The China national under-20 football team, also known as the China Youth Team (国青队), represents the People's Republic of China in international football competitions in the FIFA U-20 World Cup and the AFC Youth Championship, as well as any other under-20 international football tournaments. It is governed by the Chinese Football Association (CFA).

History
In 2017, the under-20 team began playing in the Regionalliga Südwest, a fourth-division German league, as part of an agreement between the two countries. The team would play friendly matches to fill in for the missing 20th club in the league's schedule. During the team's match on 17 November against TSV Schott Mainz, the display of a Tibetan flag led to the team walking off in protest. In the aftermath, all upcoming friendly matches were cancelled.

On 28 September 2018, China U-19 Yellow (B team) was organised as support for the national under-20 football team. Serbian manager Aleksandar Janković was appointed the first head coach of the team

Honours 
AFC Youth Championship 
Winners (1): 1985
Runners-up (3): 1982, 1996, 2004
Third-places (2): 1966, 2000

East Asian Games 
Winners (1): 2005
Third-places (2): 1993, 1997

Competition history

FIFA World Youth Championship / FIFA U-20 World Cup record

* DNE = Did not enter; DNQ = Did not qualify; Pos = Position; P = Matches played; W = Matches won; D = Matches drawn; L = Matches lost; F = Goals for; A = Goals against. 
* Denotes draws include knockout matches decided on penalty kicks.

AFC U-19 Championship/AFC U-20 Asian Cup

 DNP : Did Not Participate
 DNQ : Did Not Qualify

Toulon Tournament
 1979 Toulon Tournament
 1980 Toulon Tournament
 1983 Toulon Tournament as Tianjin
 1998 Toulon Tournament
 2002 Toulon Tournament
 2004 Toulon Tournament
 2006 Toulon Tournament
 2007 Toulon Tournament
 2011 Toulon Tournament
 2014 Toulon Tournament
 2015 Toulon Tournament
 2018 Toulon Tournament
 2019 Toulon Tournament

Torneo di Viareggio
 2019 Torneo di Viareggio

Recent matches

2023

Squad

Current coaches

Current squad
The following players were called up for 2023 AFC U-20 Asian Cup, held on March 2023.

List of head coaches
Manage records only includes International Country results

Notes

References

External links
 Chinese Football Association Official Website 
 Team China Official Website 
 Profile on FIFA 
 Profile on AFC

Asian national under-20 association football teams
Under-20